Bruno Frison (born 14 May 1936) is an Italian ice hockey player. He competed in the men's tournament at the 1964 Winter Olympics.

References

External links
 

1936 births
Living people
Italian ice hockey players
Olympic ice hockey players of Italy
Ice hockey players at the 1964 Winter Olympics
People from Cortina d'Ampezzo
SG Cortina players
Sportspeople from the Province of Belluno